Qarqay (also, Karkay) is a village in the Zaqatala Rayon of Azerbaijan.  The village forms part of the municipality of Əli Bayramlı. The population of the village is Tsakhurs. The postal code is AZ 6220.

References

External links

Populated places in Zaqatala District